Estadio Del Monte is a multi-use stadium in Morales, Izabal Department, Guatemala. It is used mostly for football matches and is the home stadium of club Deportivo Heredia. The capacity of the stadium is 8,000 people.

Del Monte
Del Monte